Pepsi-Cola was an Italian and American professional cycling team that existed from 1987 to 1989.

The team competed in the 1989 Giro d'Italia.

Major wins
1988
 Philadelphia International Championship, Roberto Gaggioli
1989
 Giro del Trentino, Mauro-Antonio Santaromita

References

Defunct cycling teams based in Italy
Defunct cycling teams based in the United States
1987 establishments in the United States
1989 disestablishments in Italy
Cycling teams established in 1987
Cycling teams disestablished in 1989